On 17 December 1992, Christopher Clunis stabbed Jonathan Zito to death at Finsbury Park station, London, England.

Christopher Clunis
Christopher Clunis was born on 18 May 1963 in Jamaica. He was treated as an inpatient at its Bellevue Hospital in 1986. Soon after, he moved to London, where from 1986 to 1992, he received psychiatric treatment at several hospitals.

Killing
At between 3 and 4pm on 17 December 1992, in Finsbury Park Underground station in North London, England, Clunis used a knife to stab 27-year-old stranger Jonathan Zito three times in the face. Zito was taken to Whittington Hospital, where he died two hours later. The fatal wound pierced his right upper eyelid and brain.

Proceedings
Clunis was arrested and taken to Holloway Road police station. At 3:45 pm on 18 December, he was charged with murder. On 28 June 1993 at the Old Bailey, he admitted manslaughter on the grounds of diminished responsibility. He was ordered to be detained indefinitely in Rampton, a secure hospital in Nottingham.

Reaction
The killing received a great deal of coverage in the British mainstream media as well as in scholarly publications, including controversy in regard to the inadequate psychiatric healthcare given to Clunis, a diagnosed paranoid schizophrenic.

References

1992 controversies
1992 crimes in the United Kingdom
1990s murders in London
Controversies in England
Crime in the London Borough of Islington
Deaths by person in London
December 1992 crimes
December 1992 events in the United Kingdom
History of mental health in the United Kingdom
History of the London Borough of Islington
Manslaughter in London